Shabanlu may refer to:
 Shabanlu, Germi, Ardabil Province
 Shabanlu, Meshgin Shahr, Ardabil Province
 Shabanlu, West Azerbaijan
 Shabanlu, Khoy, West Azerbaijan Province